Marco Parnela (born 5 January 1981) is a Finnish former professional footballer who played as a defender. Active in both Switzerland and the Netherlands, Parnela made over 200 career league appearances.

Career
Despite being born in Finland, Parnela spent all his professional career abroad. He played from 2001 to 2003 in Switzerland for FC Thun, then moving to the Netherlands later that year to join Eerste Divisie club FC Zwolle. In 2004, he then agreed to join another Eerste Divisie team, Go Ahead Eagles from Deventer, where he spent the remainder of his career.

In December 2010 Parnela announced his decision to put an end to his professional career and focus on a business career instead, effective 1 January 2011.

He joined Dutch amateurclub SV Zwaluwen Wierden in January 2011.

References

1981 births
Living people
Finnish footballers
Finland youth international footballers
FC Thun players
PEC Zwolle players
Go Ahead Eagles players
Eredivisie players
Eerste Divisie players
Finnish expatriate footballers
Expatriate footballers in Switzerland
Expatriate footballers in the Netherlands
Finnish expatriate sportspeople in the Netherlands
Finnish people of Italian descent
SV Zwaluwen Wierden players
Association football defenders
People from Orivesi
Sportspeople from Pirkanmaa